Cantharellus appalachiensis is a fungus native to eastern North America in the genus Cantharellus, which includes other popular edible chanterelles.  The cap color varies from brown to yellow, often with a brown spot on the cap at maturity.  C. appalachiensis is mycorrhizal and is found in hardwood forests.  The scientific name C. appalachiensis is after the Appalachian Mountains.

References

appalachiensis
Fungi of North America
Edible fungi
Taxa named by Ron Petersen
Fungi described in 1971